Leopold Teller (April 3, 1844, Budapest - 1908) was a Hungarian actor.

For a time he studied medicine at the University of Vienna, but in 1862 he went to Ljubljana, where he joined a theatrical company. During the following ten years he played at small theaters in Jihlava, Klagenfurt, Opava, Budapest, Leipzig, and Liebenstein; from 1874 to 1890 he was a member of the "Meininger", and appeared in such roles as Shylock, Iago, Gessler, Franz Moor, and Marinelli. On leaving the "Meininger" he secured an engagement at the Stadttheater in Hamburg, where his principal roles were Graf Trast, Doctor Crusius, and Graf Menges. In 1899 he retired from the stage, and settled as teacher of elocution in Hamburg. He has written a play entitled "Wintersonnenwende", which had considerable success.

See also 
 Teller (surname)

References 
 
 Bibliography: Eisenberg, Biog. Lex.

External links 
 Biography
 https://www.jewishvirtuallibrary.org/jsource/judaica/ejud_0002_0019_0_19780.html

1844 births
1908 deaths
Male actors from Budapest
19th-century Hungarian people
Jewish Hungarian actors
Austro-Hungarian Jews
Hungarian expatriates in Germany